Mascagnite is a rare ammonium sulfate mineral (NH4)2SO4. It crystallizes in the orthorhombic system typically forming as stalactitic masses exhibiting good cleavage. It is soft (not higher than 2.5 on the Mohs Scale) and water-soluble.  Optical properties are variable; the purest form is transparent and colorless, but opaque gray or yellow deposits are also known.

It occurs in fumaroles, as at Mount Vesuvius and associated with coal seam fires. It was named for Italian anatomist Paolo Mascagni (1752–1815) who first described the mineral.

References

Ammonium minerals
Sulfate minerals
Orthorhombic minerals
Minerals in space group 62
Mount Vesuvius